Nagstatin is a strong competitive inhibitor of the N-acetyl-β-d-glucosaminidase with the molecular formula C12H17N3O6. Nagstatin is produced by the bacterium Streptomyces amakusaensis.

References

Further reading 

  
 

Nagstatin